Political Animals is a six-episode American comedy drama miniseries created by Greg Berlanti. The series aired in the United States on USA Network from July 15 through August 19, 2012. Sigourney Weaver portrays Elaine Barrish, a divorced former First Lady and Governor of Illinois, as well as the current Secretary of State. Weaver and the show's production team acknowledge that the lead character has some similarities to Hillary Clinton. They say that the premise of the show is "very much about all families who have been in the White House, the price they've paid for being there and the fact that those same families will often try or continue to try to get back into the White House again."

While it was speculated that the miniseries would lead into a full season, on November 2, 2012, USA Network announced their decision to stick with their initial plan of producing it as a miniseries.

Overview
Elaine Barrish's husband Bud Hammond was a popular President of the United States during the 1990s despite his extramarital affairs. After leaving the White House, Elaine Barrish was elected Governor of Illinois and ran for the Democratic nomination for President, but lost to Paul Garcetti. The night Barrish conceded the nomination, she asked her husband for a divorce. Two years later, as Garcetti's Secretary of State, Barrish deals with State Department issues while trying to keep her family together.

Cast and characters

Main cast
 Sigourney Weaver as Elaine Barrish, the recently divorced Secretary of State and former First Lady and Governor of Illinois who fights various political opponents.
 Carla Gugino as Susan Berg, a reporter who has spent much time trying to undermine Elaine, but eventually becomes an unlikely ally.
 James Wolk as Douglas Hammond, Elaine's son, Chief of Staff, and T.J.'s twin brother.
 Sebastian Stan as Thomas James "T.J." Hammond, Elaine's openly gay son, and Douglas' twin brother.
 Brittany Ishibashi as Anne Ogami, Doug's fiancée.
 Ellen Burstyn as Margaret Barrish, Elaine's mother and a former showgirl in Las Vegas.
 Ciarán Hinds as Donald "Bud" Hammond, the former President and Governor of North Carolina, and Elaine's ex-husband.

Recurring cast
 Adrian Pasdar as Paul Garcetti, the current President who defeated Elaine in the presidential primaries but later appointed her Secretary of State. He is described as "a smart man who uses every resource at his disposal to his advantage".
 Dylan Baker as Fred Collier, the two-faced Vice President and former Director of Central Intelligence who is hiding some secrets.
 Roger Bart as Barry Harris, the White House Chief of Staff and Elaine's former campaign manager for her presidential campaign.
 Dan Futterman as Alex Davies, editor of the Washington Globe and Susan Berg's former boyfriend.
 Meghann Fahy as Georgia Gibbons, an ambitious young blogger who works with Susan Berg.
 LaMonica Garrett as Agent Clark, a Diplomatic Security Service agent charged with protecting Elaine.
 Linda Powell as Pauline Samson, the National Security Advisor to the President.
 Griffin Newman as Russ, Susan's personal assistant.
 Kristine Nielsen as Alice, the White House Chief of Staff.

Guest cast
 Igor Jijikine as Viktor Porchov, the Foreign Minister of Russia.
 Vanessa Redgrave as Justice Diane Nash, first openly gay Supreme Court Justice, personal friend, and mentor of Elaine.
 Blair Brown as Mrs. Berg, a former doctor and the mother of Susan Berg.
 David Monahan as Sean Reeves, a Congressman from Ohio and T.J.'s former partner in the closet.
 Dennisha Pratt as Newsreporter, for a station covering the story.

Development and production

On January 30, 2012, USA Network announced the development of a six-hour series to focus on a former First Family. They simultaneously announced that the pilot would be written and directed by Greg Berlanti, who would executive produce the series with Laurence Mark. Sarah Caplan was later announced to be executive producing as well. Ann Roth served as Weaver's costume designer for the first episode.

James Wolk was the first actor to be cast; it was announced on February 10, 2012, that he would be portraying Douglas Hammond, the son of Elaine Barrish. Three days later, it was revealed that Brittany Ishibashi would be playing Doug's fiancée, Anne Ogami. On March 6, 2012, Sigourney Weaver was cast in the lead role of Elaine Barrish. On March 9, 2012, it was announced that Carla Gugino had joined the cast as Susan Berg, a reporter who becomes one of Elaine's closest allies. Sebastian Stan joined the series on March 15, 2012, as T. J. Hammond, the other son of Elaine Barrish, and Doug's brother. One week later, it was announced that Ciarán Hinds would play the former president and Elaine's ex-husband, Bud Hammond. By April 14, 2012, Ellen Burstyn had joined the series as Margaret Barrish, Elaine's mother and a former Vegas showgirl. On May 2, 2012, it was announced that Adrian Pasdar would appear in a recurring role in all six episodes as the current president, Paul Garcetti. The casting of Dylan Baker in the recurring role of Vice President Fred Collier was announced on May 7, 2012.

Linda Powell, the daughter of former United States Secretary of State Colin Powell, appeared in the first episode as the national security advisor to the president. Roger Bart, Dan Futterman, and Vanessa Redgrave also made appearances in the series. David Monahan appeared in the fourth episode, while Blair Brown appeared in the fifth as Barbara Berg, the mother of Susan.

By May 2, 2012, principal photography had begun in Philadelphia, Pennsylvania.

The theme music is "Future Starts Slow" by The Kills.

Episodes

International broadcasts
The show aired on the Bravo specialty channel in Canada, with episodes playing on the same day as in the United States.

Reception

Critical reception
Political Animals received "generally favorable" reviews based on an aggregate score of 65/100 from 33 critics on Metacritic. Rob Brunner of Entertainment Weekly called the series a "well-acted, entertainingly soapy drama" that "offers a fun and credible look at the complicated intersection of love, gender, and politics." The Los Angeles Times Robert Lloyd called the series "a high-class, relatively naturalistic, behind-closed-doors soap opera that plays in fairly obvious yet also fairly affecting ways with the space between public face and private pain and is made highly watchable by an excellent cast that finds the human among the hokum." Alan Sepinwall of HitFix stated: "with a cast this good, and with so many potentially juicy conflicts already in play, I'm going to take a more optimistic point of view than Elaine Barrish might."

However, there were some detractors. Linda Stasi of the New York Post simply stated: "The actors are great, but the show isn't." The Hollywood Reporters Tim Goodman commented: "what Animals is trying to do is take The West Wing and turn it into Dallas. And if you don't like Dallas, that can be a real let down [sic]." Verne Gay of Newsday was the harshest critic, calling the series "stupendously silly," adding "it's a clanking, clattering collection of collagenous clinkers—of dialogue so inept, of acting performances so preposterous, of plot points so clichéd that the only question worth posing is why someone of Weaver's stature would be caught anywhere near a turkey like this."

Awards and nominations

References

External links
 
 

2012 American television series debuts
2012 American television series endings
2010s American comedy-drama television series
2010s American comedy television miniseries
2010s American drama television miniseries
English-language television shows
2010s American political television series
Primetime Emmy Award-winning television series
Television series about dysfunctional families
2010s American LGBT-related drama television series
Television series about journalism
Television series by Warner Horizon Television
Television shows set in Washington, D.C.
USA Network original programming
Television series created by Greg Berlanti
White House in fiction
Television series set in the 1990s
Television series set in 2010
Television series set in 2012
American political drama television series
Television shows filmed in Pennsylvania